Samuel Montague may refer to:

 Samuel L. Montague (1829–1869), Massachusetts politician
 Samuel S. Montague (1830–1883), American railroad executive
 Samuel Montagu, 1st Baron Swaythling (1832–1911), British banker and philanthropist
 Samuel T. Montague (1868–1939), member of the Virginia Senate